Dámasa Cabezón (179217 March 1861) was an Argentine-Chilean educator and women's education pioneer in 19th-century South America. A daughter of the Spanish educator José León Cabezón, she founded educational institutes for girls in Santiago de Chile (1838) and La Paz, Bolivia (1845). She has been credited with establishing the first generation of secular schools for girls in Chile.

Early life
Dámasa Cabezón was the daughter of the Spanish educator  and his wife María Martínez Outes. Her father had emigrated from Spain to Salta in the Viceroyalty of the Río de la Plata where he founded a school for the children of the colonial upper-class. In 1828, she accompanied her father to Santiago de Chile and began teaching Latin at a similar school he had founded in the city.

Career
In 1832, together with her sister Manuela, Cabezón established a school for girls in Santiago, which she directed until 1845. In that year, she relocated to La Paz, Bolivia, where she was hired by the government of José Ballivián to establish an educational institute for women along the lines of her foundation in Chile. This institute educated, among others, the Bolivian composer Modesta Sanginés Uriarte. Having returned from Bolivia in 1848, she directed a school in La Serena for most of the 1850s before retiring to Valparaíso, where she died in March 1861. The historian Joyce Contreras Villalobos wrote that Cabezón's were the first attempts at establishing secular institutes for women's education in Chile.

References

Bibliography

1792 births
1861 deaths
19th-century Chilean women
19th-century Argentine educators
Argentine educators
Argentine women educators
Chilean educators
Chilean women educators
People from Salta